Sam Hancock (born 9 January 1980 in Surrey) is a British classic and historic car consultant, writer, presenter and racing driver.

Racing record

American Open-Wheel racing results
(key) (Races in bold indicate pole position, races in italics indicate fastest race lap)

Barber Dodge Pro Series

Complete International Formula 3000 results
(key) (Races in bold indicate pole position; races in italics indicate fastest lap.)

24 Hours of Le Mans results

Complete Porsche Supercup results
(key) (Races in bold indicate pole position – 2 points awarded 2008 onwards in all races) (Races in italics indicate fastest lap)

‡ Not eligible for points.

References

External links

 Official website
 Career statistics from Driver Database

1980 births
Living people
People from Surrey
English racing drivers
Formula Palmer Audi drivers
24 Hours of Le Mans drivers
International Formula 3000 drivers
American Le Mans Series drivers
European Le Mans Series drivers
Porsche Supercup drivers
Barber Pro Series drivers
24 Hours of Spa drivers
Porsche Carrera Cup GB drivers

Aston Martin Racing drivers
Jota Sport drivers
Super Nova Racing drivers